Ross is an unincorporated community in Audubon County, Iowa, in the United States.

History
 
Ross was platted in July 1882, in Leroy Township's Section 4. It was named in honor of a local farmer. 

Among the establishments in the community of Ross were the post office (established in 1883), a blacksmith shop, a lumber yard, a general store, a hardware store, and Ross Grain Elevator, now listed on the National Register of Historic Places. A railroad depot was completed in 1885. 

Ross' population was 55 in 1902. By 1915, both Methodist and Lutheran churches operated in Ross.

References

Unincorporated communities in Audubon County, Iowa
1882 establishments in Iowa
Unincorporated communities in Iowa